Humberto Selvetti (31 March 1932 – 26 April 1992) was an Argentine heavyweight weightlifter. He competed at the 1952, 1956 and 1964 Summer Olympics and finished in second, third and 17th place, respectively. He also won four medals at world championships and Pan American Games and set a world record in the press, in 1951.

References

External links

 
 
 
 

1932 births
1992 deaths
Argentine male weightlifters
Argentine people of Italian descent
Olympic weightlifters of Argentina
Olympic silver medalists for Argentina
Olympic bronze medalists for Argentina
Olympic medalists in weightlifting
Weightlifters at the 1952 Summer Olympics
Weightlifters at the 1956 Summer Olympics
Weightlifters at the 1964 Summer Olympics
Medalists at the 1956 Summer Olympics
Medalists at the 1952 Summer Olympics
World Weightlifting Championships medalists
Pan American Games silver medalists for Argentina
Pan American Games medalists in weightlifting
Weightlifters at the 1955 Pan American Games
Weightlifters at the 1959 Pan American Games
Medalists at the 1955 Pan American Games
Medalists at the 1959 Pan American Games
Sportspeople from Buenos Aires Province